The Samoa Association of Sports and National Olympic Committee (IOC code: SAM) is the National Olympic Committee representing Samoa.

See also
Samoa at the Olympics
Samoa at the Commonwealth Games

References 

Samoa